Muthu Engal Sothu is a 1983 Indian Tamil-language film directed by G. N. Rangarajan, starring Prabhu and Radha. It was released on 9 December 1983.

Plot 

Muthu is a trusted servant of a rich man who unknown to Muthu is his father.

Cast 
Prabhu as Muthu
Radha
Rajeev
Venu Arvind
Geetha
K. A. Thangavelu
Manorama
Anuradha
Vanitha
Poornam Viswanathan as Muthu's father
S. N. Parvathy
Thengai Srinivasan
Sivachandran

Production 
Muthu Engal Sothu is the feature film debut of Venu Arvind.

Soundtrack 
Soundtrack was composed by Ilaiyaraaja.

References

External links 
 

1980s Tamil-language films
1983 films
Films directed by G. N. Rangarajan
Films scored by Ilaiyaraaja